The following is a list of FCC-licensed radio stations in the U.S. state of Virginia which can be sorted by their call signs, frequencies, cities of license, licensees, and programming formats.

List of radio stations

Defunct
 WBBL
 WBDY
 WBVA
 WCLM-LP
 WDIC
 WDUF
 WJRX-LP
 WJYI
 WLEE
 WMVA
 WODI
 WORJ-LP
 WOWZ
 WPEX
 WPVC-LP
 WRAP
 WRRW-LP
 WSVG
 WVAB
 WXMY
 WXZR-LP

See also
 Virginia media
 List of newspapers in Virginia
 List of television stations in Virginia
 Media of cities in Virginia: Chesapeake, Hampton, Newport News, Norfolk, Richmond, Roanoke, Virginia Beach

References

Bibliography

External links

  (Directory ceased in 2017)
 Virginia Association of Broadcasters
 Mid-Atlantic Antique Radio Club

Images

 
Virginia
Radio